In enzymology, a chalcone isomerase is an enzyme that catalyzes the chemical reaction

a chalcone  a flavanone

Hence, this enzyme has one substrate, a chalcone, and one product, a flavanone.

This enzyme belongs to the family of isomerases, specifically the class of intramolecular lyases.  The systematic name of this enzyme class is flavanone lyase (decyclizing). This enzyme is also called chalcone-flavanone isomerase.  This enzyme participates in flavonoid biosynthesis.

The Petunia hybrida (Petunia) genome contains two genes coding for very similar enzymes, ChiA and ChiB, but only the first seems to encode a functional chalcone isomerase.

Structural studies

Chalcone isomerase has a core 2-layer alpha/beta structure consisting of beta(3)-alpha(2)-beta-alpha(2)-beta(3).

References

Further reading 
 

Protein domains
EC 5.5.1
Enzymes of known structure
Chalconoids metabolism
Flavanones metabolism